Dotrice is a surname. Notable people with the surname include:

 Roy Dotrice, OBE (1923–2017), English actor
 Kay Dotrice (1929–2007), British actress, wife of Roy
 Michele Dotrice (born 1948), English actress, daughter of Roy and Kay
 Karen Dotrice (born 1955), English actress, daughter of Roy and Kay